This is a list of international conventions relating to the protection of animals.

General conventions 
 Convention on Biological Diversity (CBD, Biodiversity Convention, Rio Convention)
 World Cultural and Natural Heritage Convention (UNESCO)
 Ramsar Convention on Wetlands of International Importance Especially as Waterfowl Habitat (Ramsar Convention, Convention on Wetlands)
 Convention on the Conservation of Migratory Species of Wild Animals (Convention on Migratory Species (CMS), Bonn Convention)
 Convention on International Trade in Endangered Species of Wild Fauna and Flora (CITES, Washington Convention)

Specialised conventions  
 International Convention on the Protection of Birds (followed the 1902 International Convention for the Protection of Birds that are Useful for Agriculture)
 Migratory Bird Treaty (Migratory Birds Convention – Canada and United States)
 Convention for the Conservation of Antarctic Marine Living Resources (CCAMLR, Canberra Convention)
 African Convention on the Conservation of Nature and Natural Resources (Algiers Convention)
 Convention on the Conservation of the Vicuña (1969 La Paz Convention, 1979 Lima Convention)
 International Convention for the Regulation of Whaling (ICRW, replaces the 1931 Geneva Convention for Regulation of Whaling and the 1937 International Agreement for the Regulation of Whaling)
 International Whaling Commission 1982 moratorium on whaling, 2018 Florianópolis Declaration
 International Agreement on the Preservation of Polar Bears and their Habitat (Agreement on the Conservation of Polar Bears, Oslo Agreement)
 Agreement on the Conservation of Albatrosses and Petrels (ACAP, Hobart Agreement)

Council of Europe  

 Berne Convention on the Conservation of European Wildlife and Natural Habitats (Bern/Berne Convention; also acceded by several non-CoE member states)
 European Convention for the Protection of Animals during International Transport (original 1968 animal transport convention & revised 2003 animal transport convention)
 European Convention for the Protection of Pet Animals
 European Convention for the Protection of Animals for Slaughter (Slaughter Convention)
 European Convention for the Protection of Animals kept for Farming Purposes (Farm Animal Convention)
 European Convention for the Protection of Vertebrate Animals Used for Experimental and Other Scientific Purposes

See also  
 Animal rights
 Animal rights by country or territory
 Animal welfare
 International law
 International human rights instruments
 List of animal rights advocates
 List of international environmental agreements
 Timeline of animal welfare and rights

Animal treaties
Animal welfare and rights legislation
Council of Europe treaties
Lists of treaties